William Duffy was a Roman Catholic prelate who served as Titular Bishop of Ascalon (1531–?),  suffragan bishop to the Bishop of St Asaph (1531–1535) and suffragan bishop to the Archbishop of York (1535–?).

Biography
William Duffy was ordained a priest in the Order of Friars Minor. On 10 July 1531, he was appointed during the papacy of Pope Paul II as Titular Bishop of Ascalon and Auxiliary Bishop of St Asaph. On 16 July 1531, he was consecrated bishop by Octavio de Cesi, Bishop of Cervia, with Bernardo Ruggieri, Bishop Emeritus of Sora serving as one of the co-consecrators. He served as suffragan bishop to the Bishop of St Asaph until his appointment as  suffragan bishop to the  Archbishop of York in 1535. Probably to be identified with William Duffield, Bishop of "Ascalensis," and Vicar of Barton-upon-Humber, Lincolnshire, who functioned as a suffragan (auxiliary) bishop in the dioceses of Lincoln and York 1535–38. He was executed for treason in 1538 after repudiating the royal supremacy.

References

External links and additional sources
 (for Chronology of Bishops)
 (for Chronology of Bishops)

16th-century English Roman Catholic bishops
Bishops appointed by Pope Paul II
Franciscan bishops
People executed under Henry VIII